El Amor is the seventh studio album by Spanish duo Azúcar Moreno, released on Sony International in 1994.

The album saw Azúcar Moreno making their first collaborations with some of the top names in the world of Latin music in the United States, such as former Miami Sound Machine member Emilio Estefan Jr., composer and producer Estéfano, Kike Santander and Juan R. Marquez, the team behind numerous hits for world-renowned artists such as Julio Iglesias, Gloria Estefan, Jon Secada, Shakira and Chayanne. The title track and the biggest hit "El Amor" was featured in the Hollywood movie The Specialist, starring Sylvester Stallone and Sharon Stone. The extended 12" mix of the song was included on the CD version of El Amor and a special edition of the soundtrack album called The Specialist - The Remixes featured Tony Moran's twelve minutes forty-two seconds Multiple Orgasm Mix, and the song managed to cross over to the US dance charts, reaching #50 on Billboard'''s Hot Dance Club Play listing in early 1995. The follow-up single "No Será Facil", produced by the same team, was written by Gloria Estefan and originally recorded by the Miami Sound Machine on their 1982 album Rio. Further hits from the album include "No Tendré Piedad" and "Hay Que Saber Perder".
 
As opposed to Azúcar Moreno's previous albums Bandido and Mambo, El Amor did not include any cover versions of songs from the Anglosaxon world of rock and pop but it did see the Salazár sisters interpreting material by some of the Spanish and Latin American music scene's most acknowledged songwriters and artists. Cherito Jimenez' merengue "Nadie Como Tu" was originally recorded by The New York Band in 1989. "Ladrón de Amores" was penned by Spanish singer-songwriter Rosana Arbelo. "Ando Buscando un Amor" was written by one of the Dominican Republic's leading composers and singers, Victor Victor (full name Victor José Victor Rojas) and "De Lo Que Te Has Perdido" is one of legendary Mexican singer Marco Antonio Muñiz' signature tunes. "Desnúdate, Desnúdame" was originally one of Spanish singer-songwriter Miguel Gallardo's biggest hits in the 1970s. "A Galope" was a newly composed collaboration between Gallardo and the writers of Azúcar Moreno's breakthrough hit "Bandido", Raúl Orellana and Jaime Stinus.El Amor became Azúcar Moreno's breakthrough on the North American market and won them the prize for Best Group Of The Year at Billboard's Latin Music Awards in 1994.

"El Amor" and "No Será Facil" were both included on Azúcar Moreno's first greatest hits compilation Mucho Azúcar - Grandes Éxitos'' in 1997.

Track listing

"El Amor" (Estefano, Kiko Santander) - 4:52 
"No Será Fácil" (Gloria Estefan) - 4:20 
"Hay Que Saber Perder" (Emilio Estefan Jr., Juan R. Márquez) - 3:59 
"No Tendré Piedad" (J. L. Abel, Jaime Stinus) - 3:13 
"Colgada de la Luna" (Victor Victor) - 3:37 
"Ladrón de Amores" (Rosana Arbelo) - 2:57 
"Desnúdate, Desnúdame" (Miguel Gallardo) - 3:40 
"Nadie Como Tu" (Cherito) - 4:09 
"No Me Vuelvo a Enamorar" (Aguilera Valadez Alberto) - 3:32 
"De Lo Que Te Has Perdido" (Dino Ramos) - 3:41 
"A Galope" (Miguel Gallardo, Raúl Orellana, Jaime Stinus) - 3:53 
"Ando Buscando un Amor" (Victor Victor) - 4:23 
"El Amor" [12"] (Estefano, Kiko Santander) - 7:32
 CD bonus track

Personnel
 Azúcar Moreno - vocals
 Joel Numa - drums, programming 
 Rene Toledo - guitar 
 Julio Hernandez - bass guitar
 Randall Barlow - brass, trumpet
 Teddy Mulet - brass, trombone, trumpet, vocals 
 Clay Oswald - piano
 Luis Santiago - percussion
 Estéfano - vocals
 Miriam Mandelkern - vocals
 Tony Concepcion - brass 
 Dana Teboe - brass
 Franco Castellani - piano
 Juan R. Marquez - bass guitar, guitar, programming, vocals 
 Manny López - percussion  
 Tomás de San Julian - flamenco vocals    
 Eduardo García - bass
 Jaime Stinus - guitar, keyboards, programming, AKAI sampler
 M. Gas - piano 
 Tito Duarte - vocals, percussion, programming   
 Vicente Borland - vocals 
 Bilby - accordion  
 Xabi Ibañez - keyboards 
 Gerardo Nuñez - flamenco guitar
 Raúl Orellana - programming  
 Jose Luis Medrano - trumpet

Production
 Emilio Estefan, Jr. - record producer, musical director ("El Amor", "No Sera Facil", "Hay Que Saber Perder") 
 Estéfano - producer ("No Sera Facil"), vocal producer, musical arranger ("El Amor", "No Sera Facil", "Hay Que Saber Perder")
 Kike Santander - musical arranger ("El Amor", "No Sera Facil", "Hay Que Saber Perder")  
 Juan R. Márquez - producer ("Hay Que Saber Perder"), musical arranger ("El Amor", "No Sera Facil", "Hay Que Saber Perder")  
 Jaime Stinus - producer ("No Tendré Piedad", "A Galope")
 Raúl Orellana - producer, musical arranger, musical director ("A Galope") 
 Julio Palacios - producer, musical arranger ("Colgada De La Luna", "Ladron De Amores", "Desnudate, Desnudame", "Nadie Como Tu", "De Lo Que Te Has Perdido", "Ando Buscando Un Amor") 
 Franco Castellani - musical arranger 
 Eric Schilling - mixing
 Mike Couzzi - mixing    
 Ron Taylor - engineer, mixing 
 Javier Vacas - engineer
 Patrice Wilkinson Levinsohn - engineer  
 Chris Wiggins - assistant engineer
 Sebastián Krys - assistant engineer
 Sean Chambers - assistant engineer
 Scott Canto - assistant engineer
 Marcelo Anez - assistant engineer    
 Carlos Martin - design

Sources and external links
 [ Allmusic discography]
 Discogs.com discography
 Rateyourmusic.com discography
 Estéfano biography, BMI

References

1994 albums
Albums produced by Estéfano
Azúcar Moreno albums